Mead House is a historic home located at Galway in Saratoga County, New York.  It was built about 1825 and is a 2-story, five-by-two-bay timber framed residence. It has a rectangular main block with an attached 2-story gable-roofed wing and -story kitchen wing. It center hall plan with vernacular Federal-style interior decoration.  Also on the property is a contributing frame carriage barn.

It was added to the National Register of Historic Places in 2004.

References

Houses on the National Register of Historic Places in New York (state)
Federal architecture in New York (state)
Houses completed in 1825
Houses in Saratoga County, New York
National Register of Historic Places in Saratoga County, New York